Treddin' on Thin Ice is the debut album by UK grime artist Wiley released on XL Recordings. It was released on 26 April 2004.

The album is seen as a critical success in grime music with an enduring and influential forward facing sound. However, commercially the album did not do as well, with one single ("Wot Do U Call It", a song addressing the debate over the categorization of grime) making the top 40 in the UK music charts.

Critical reception

Track listing

Certifications

References

2004 debut albums
Wiley (musician) albums
XL Recordings albums